Madhobpur Lake is a lake in Kamalganj Upazila, Moulvibazar District, Bangladesh. It is a natural lake inside the Madhabpur tea estate.

Wildlife
It is home to the great white-bellied heron, the only confirmed site in Bangladesh.

Gallery

References

External links
 Photo of Madhobpur Lake in Maulvi Bazar district Government Web Portal 
 Madhobpur Lake in the list of place of interest in Maulvi Bazar District Government Web Portal

Srimangal Upazila
Lakes of Bangladesh